= List of Syrian records in speed skating =

The following are the unofficial national records in speed skating in Syria. Syria is not a member of the ISU.

== Men ==
Event	Record	Athlete	Date	Meet	Place	Ref
500 meters	1:12.44	Rawad Ajameah	10 February 2022	Club competition	Arendal, Norway	
500 meters × 2						
1000 meters	2:58.95	Rawad Ajameah	9 February 2023		Arendal, Norway	
1500 meters						
3000 meters						
5000 meters						
10000 meters						
Team pursuit (8 laps)						
Sprint combination						
Small combination						
Big combination						

== Women ==
Event	Record	Athlete	Date	Meet	Place	Ref
500 meters						
500 meters × 2						
1000 meters						
1500 meters						
3000 meters						
5000 meters						
10000 meters						
Team pursuit (6 laps)						
Sprint combination						
Mini combination						
Small combination						
